The 1963–64 Volleyball Women's European Cup was the fifth edition of the official competition for European women's volleyball national champions. It was contested by 16 teams, six more than the previous edition, with Israel and Switzerland debuting, so a Round of 16 could be held for the first time. Dynamo Moscow defeated defending champion Levski Sofia in the semifinals and Dynamo Berlin in the final to win its third title.

Round of 16

Quarterfinals

Semifinals

Final

References

European Cup
European Cup
CEV Women's Champions League